HFF, Inc. was a provider of capital markets and brokerage services to owners of commercial real estate. In 2019, the company was acquired by JLL.

History
In 1974, John Fowler and Peter Goedecke founded Fowler, Goedeneke & Company. In 1982, Holliday Fenoglio & Co was founded by Harold E. (Hal) Holliday and John Fenoglio.

In 1994, Amresco acquired Holliday Fenoglio Dockerty & Gibson.

In 1998, Amresco acquired Fowler, Goedecke, Ellis & O'Connor Inc. and merged the two companies to form Holliday Fenoglio Fowler L.P.

In 1999, the company was sold to Lend Lease Group for $228 million.

In 2007, the company became a public company via an initial public offering that raised $257 million.

In 2012, founders Holliday and Fenoglio went to work for CBRE Group.

In July 2019, JLL acquired the company.

References

Commercial real estate companies
Real estate companies established in 1998
Real estate companies disestablished in 2019
1998 establishments in Texas
2019 disestablishments in Texas
2007 initial public offerings
2019 mergers and acquisitions
Companies based in Dallas
Companies formerly listed on the New York Stock Exchange